Soe Moe Kyaw (born 23 March 1999) is a Burmese footballer who is currently playing as a defender.

Style of play
He is a physically strong player who can score from powerful headers. However, he can get aggressive at times, noticeably in the Asian Cup Qualifiers, where he tackled a Tajikistan player inside the 18-yard box and gave his opponents a goal, and also saw him get a red card.

Career statistics

International

References

1999 births
Living people
Burmese footballers
Myanmar international footballers
Association football defenders
Soe Moe Kyaw
Ayeyawady United F.C. players
Soe Moe Kyaw
Competitors at the 2019 Southeast Asian Games
Southeast Asian Games medalists in football
Southeast Asian Games bronze medalists for Myanmar
Competitors at the 2021 Southeast Asian Games